Cómo Será La Mujer is the second album by Rigo Tovar and the band Costa Azul.

Track listing
Cómo Será La Mujer
 Pajarillo Montañero
 El Día Que Seas Para Mí
 Me Voy Pa'l Pueblo
 Venus
 Novio Celoso
 El Amor Que Se Alejó
 Si Supiera Ella
 Acapulco, Eres Mi Amor
 Quizás, Quizás, Quizás

1973 albums